Rokan is the name of the landscape and area in Riau Province.

 Rokan River, river in Riau Province
 Rokan Hulu Regency, Regency in Riau, Indonesia
 Rokan Hilir Regency, Regency in Riau, Indonesia